Blackmoor Copse is a woodland in southeast Wiltshire, England, managed as a nature reserve by the Wiltshire Wildlife Trust.

A  area of the wood was notified as a biological Site of Special Scientific Interest in 1971.

The site is adjacent to another, larger, woodland SSSI, Bentley Wood.

References

External links
 Natural England website (SSSI information)
 Blackmoor Copse page at Wiltshire Web
 SSSI boundary at the DEFRA Magic Maps website

Forests and woodlands of Wiltshire
Sites of Special Scientific Interest in Wiltshire
Sites of Special Scientific Interest notified in 1971
Wiltshire Wildlife Trust reserves